Springfield United Methodist Church (formerly Springfield Methodist) was established in 1954  in the Washington, DC suburb of Springfield, Virginia.  Springfield United Methodist Church is a member of the Alexandria District in the Virginia Conference of the United Methodist Church.
The first service of the church that would become Springfield Methodist was held in January 1954 at Garfield School. Thirty-three residents were in attendance along with representatives of the sponsoring church, Trinity Methodist  in Alexandria.

Ground breaking for the first unit of the new church building occurred in 1955, and the second unit was completed in 1960.  By June 1974, the original building had been remodeled and air conditioning installed.  In 2000 the church was completely renovated inside and outside and the pipe organ refurbished.

References

Churches in Fairfax County, Virginia
Springfield, Virginia
Christian organizations established in 1954
Churches completed in 1960
Methodist churches in Virginia
1954 establishments in Virginia